Parliamentary elections were held in Colombia on 16 March 1941 to elect the Chamber of Representatives. The Liberal Party received the most votes.

Results

References

Parliamentary elections in Colombia
Colombia
1941 in Colombia
Election and referendum articles with incomplete results
March 1941 events